Badri Bitsadze (born 27 April 1960) is the former Chief of the Border Police of Georgia. He holds the rank of Lieutenant General, and previously held the posts of Chief Military Prosecutor, Deputy General Prosecutor, and Deputy Minister of Internal Affairs. He is married to the former Chairwoman of the Parliament of Georgia and twofold former interim President of Georgia, Nino Burjanadze.

Bitsadze attended Tbilisi State University, Faculty of Law and received a Ph.D. from USSR Scientific Institute for Prosecutors. He's a recipient of the III Degree Vakhtang Gorgasali Order award.

Bitsadze resigned his position on 29 October 2008, claiming that a campaign to discredit the agency was underway because his wife, the former parliamentary chairperson, had withdrawn into opposition to the current government.

Later that year, Bitsadze became involved with his wife's newly founded party Democratic Movement–United Georgia. In March 2009, several party activists, including a driver of Badri Bitsadze, were arrested by the Georgian police on arms charges. Burjanadze said after the Interior Ministry's statement that she was ready to cooperate with the investigation, but claimed that evidence put forth by the investigation was not enough and needed further scrutiny.

Arrest

In early June 2011 Deputy Prosecutor General David Sakvarelidze said he has requested the Tbilisi City Court issue an arrest warrant for Badri Bitsadze, who was accused of organizing attacks on policemen during anti-governmental protests in May 2011 and did not pay 100,000 Laris for bail. His current whereabouts is not clear, however on July 25, Nino Burjanadze gave an interview, Where she stated that her husband would seek for political asylum. The investigation of this issue, has been very controversial, due to shortage of strong evidences.

References

1960 births
Living people
Police officers from Georgia (country)
Generals from Georgia (country)
Generals of the Defense Forces of Georgia
First ladies and gentlemen of Georgia (country)
Tbilisi State University alumni